Kosher locusts are varieties of locust deemed permissible for consumption under the laws of kashrut (Jewish dietary law). While the consumption of most insects is forbidden under the laws of kashrut, the rabbis of the Talmud identified eight kosher species of locust. However, the identity of those species is in dispute.

Despite the lingering uncertainty, some people today view certain species of locusts as kosher and they can be bought in Israel for consumption.

Laws
The Biblical command regarding kosher locusts goes as follows:
All winged swarming things that go upon all fours are a detestable thing unto you. Yet these may ye eat of all winged swarming things that go upon all fours, which have jointed legs above their feet, with which to leap upon the earth. These of them ye may eat: the arbeh after its kinds, and the salam after its kinds, and the hargol after its kinds, and the hagav after its kinds. But all winged swarming things, which have four feet, are a detestable thing unto you.

The identity of the four permitted types is difficult to ascertain. The common names used in the Bible refer only to color and broad morphological generalities shared by many Middle-Eastern species. Also, although it is often useful for identification, the geographic location of these locusts in the text is unclear. Also, using primarily color to identify insect species is a notoriously unreliable approach. Insects that come to adulthood will have slightly different colors based on season, diet, and prevailing climate.

The Mishnah gives additional criteria:
Among the grasshoppers (hagavim): all that have four legs, and four wings, and [two additional] jumping legs, and its wings cover most of its body [are permitted]. Rabbi Yosi says: and its name must be hagav.

Unlike the Bible which permits certain named types of insect, this Mishnah lists physical characteristics which are met by many species of grasshoppers, and every species of locust. However, Rabbi Yosi's opinion is more restrictive: like the Bible, it requires a specific type name, not just physical characteristics.

Rabbi Yosi's restriction is accepted by many, but not all, rishonim. However, opinions differ on how it is to be understood. According to Tur, there must be a specific tradition that a particular insect is within the category of hagav. However, according to Maimonides, all that is needed is for the species to be referred to as a hagav or a translation of this term, such as "locust".

Tradition
With regards to kosher species of locust,  "continuous tradition" exists for 3 species: desert locust (Schistocerca gregaria), migratory locust (Locusta migratoria), and Egyptian grasshopper (Anacridium aegyptium).

It is unnecessary to have a "personal tradition" in order to eat locusts one who travels to a place where the people do have a tradition may eat locusts there. The Yemenite Jews and some others had such a continuous tradition.

British Chief Rabbi Joseph Hertz says in his commentary on :
"None of the four kinds of locust mentioned is certainly known (RV Margin). For this reason also, later Jewish authorities, realizing that it is impossible to avoid errors being made declare every species of locust to be forbidden."

Some explain that a distinguishing characteristic of kosher grasshoppers is that they sometimes swarm.

In Yemen

Despite the general adherence of Yemenite Jews to the rulings of Maimonides, they did not follow Maimonides' lenient opinion that merely recognising a locust's features was sufficient to permit it. Rather, they ate only those locusts which they possessed a tradition of eating.

According to Yemenite Jewish tradition, the edible locust referred to in the Torah is identified by the figure resembling the Hebrew letter chet (ח) on the underside of the thorax.

Yemenite Jews historically identified the Torah's locust types as follows:

 Arbeh ("red locust"): The most common locust consumed in Yemen was the desert locust (Schistocerca gregaria), whose color ranges from yellowish-green to grey, to reddish in colour when it reaches maturity (or ).
 Chagav (grasshopper or "white locust"): Only certain species were still eaten in Yemen, such as the species now known as the greyish or brownish Egyptian locust (Anacridium aegyptium), thought by some to be an edible grasshopper, even though it was known in Arabic by its generic name al-Jaraad, the Desert Locust, and the Migratory Locust (as quoted from Rabbi Yitzhak Ratzabi).

In Yemen, the locust and the grasshopper share the same Arabic name, although Jews in Yemen recognize the differences between the two.

In 1911, Abraham Isaac Kook, the chief rabbi of Ottoman Palestine, addressed a question to the rabbinic Court at Sana'a concerning their custom of eating grasshoppers, and whether this custom was observed by observing their outward features, or by simply relying upon an oral tradition.

The reply given to him by the court was as follows: "The grasshoppers which are eaten by way of a tradition from our forefathers, which happen to be clean, are well-known unto us. But there are yet other species which have all the recognizable features of being clean, yet we do practice abstaining from them.

[Appendage]: The clean grasshoppers about which we have a tradition are actually three species having each one different coloration [from the other], and each of them are called by us in the Arabian tongue, ğarād (locusts). But there are yet other species, about which we have no tradition, and we will not eat them. One of which is a little larger in size than the grasshoppers, having the name of `awsham. There is yet another variety, smaller in size than the grasshopper, and it is called ḥanājir (katydids)."

Manner of preparation
Several methods were used to prepare locusts, prior to eating them. One popular way was to take the locusts and throw them into a pot of boiling salt water. After cooking for a few minutes, they were placed in a heated oven to dry them, or else spread out in the sun to dry. Once dried, the heads, wings and legs were removed, leaving only the thorax and abdomen for consumption.

Another method was to stoke an earthenware stove and, when fully heated, to cast them alive into the cavity of the stove. Once roasted, they were taken out and a brine solution was sprinkled over them, before spreading them out in the sun to dry, usually upon one’s rooftop. Those with refined tastes saw it as a delicacy.

In North Africa
In the Jewish community of Djerba, Tunisia, the consumption of locusts was forbidden by a takkanah of Rabbi Aharon Perez in the mid-18th century. According to his letter to Rabbi David Eliyahu Hajaj, eating locusts was still an accepted practice in Tunisia at the time.

Although Perez was consumer of locusts himself, he quit the habit after reading Rabbi Chaim ibn Attar's book Peri To`ar, and moved in favour to prohibit consumption. Rashi explained that the term "jumping legs" in the Mishnah refers to legs that are adjacent to the locust's neck. However, no locust consumed in ibn Attar's time possesses such a body plan (instead, the jumping legs are located at the back of the animal), leading ibn Attar to conclude that the species being consumed were not the Torah's permitted locusts.

However, as the practice was still widely accepted in the city of Tunis—the rabbinical court of which was considered to have the higher authority—Perez kept his decision to himself without making it public. After the prohibition against eating locusts was finally declared in Tunis, Perez encouraged banning the practice in Djerba as well.

(As for the modern-day applicability of ibn Attar's argument: None of the thousands of species of grasshopper or locust known to zoologists possess the body plan suggested by Rashi's comment. According to Natan Slifkin, while it was reasonable for ibn Attar to conclude in the 18th century that the Torah referred to a different unknown species of locust, with more comprehensive modern zoology such a conclusion is untenable. Various additional reasons have been suggested why this comment of Rashi's should not be the basis for halacha: it was meant to explain the words of the Biblical verse rather than to decide halacha; it is a lone opinion contradicted by many other authorities; Rashi himself seems to contradict this comment elsewhere.)

Additionally, in Morocco, locusts were eaten into the 1900s. Only those who had a "continuous tradition" of both eating them and knowing the identifying sign of the kosher locusts would eat them.

How and by whom kosher locusts were eaten
Locusts were not considered a delicacy rather they were food for the poor. It has been suggested that consuming locusts is permitted precisely because they destroy crops. Thus, if the locusts were to eat all one's crops, one could instead eat locusts and avoid starvation. 

A midrash describes the pickling of locusts before their consumption:

See also
Chapulines
Entomophagy
Nsenene

References

Sources

Further reading

External links
Laws of Judaism concerning insects From the Torah and Maimonides’ Code of Jewish Law
Kosher locust a summary of the topic by Rabbi Natan Slifkin

Insects as food
Locust
Jewish cuisine
Locusts
Insects in religion
Jews and Judaism in Yemen
Jews and Judaism in Tunisia